Shulevo is a rural locality (a village) in Vozhbalskoye Rural Settlement, Totemsky District, Vologda Oblast, Russia. The population was 8 as of 2002.

Geography 
Shulevo is located 42 km west of Totma (the district's administrative centre) by road. Mishukovo is the nearest rural locality.

References 

Rural localities in Tarnogsky District